Northeastern University School of Law (NUSL) is the law school of Northeastern University in Boston, Massachusetts. Founded as an evening program to meet the needs of its local community, NUSL is nationally recognized for its cooperative legal education and public interest law programs.

History

Northeastern University School of Law was founded by the Boston Young Men's Christian Association (YMCA) in 1898 as the first evening law program in the city. At the time, only two law schools were in the Boston area and the time-honored practice of reading law in the office of an established lawyer was losing its effectiveness. An advisory committee, consisting of James Barr Ames, dean of the Harvard Law School; Samuel Bennett, dean of the Boston University School of Law; and Massachusetts Judge James R. Dunbar, was formed to assist with the formation of the evening law program. The program was incorporated as an LL.B.-granting law school, the Evening School of Law of Boston YMCA, in 1904. Additional campuses of YMCA Law School were opened in Worcester, Massachusetts by 1917, in Springfield, Massachusetts by 1919, and Providence, Rhode Island by 1921. The Worcester and Providence branches were closed by 1942, but the Springfield branch eventually became the Western New England University School of Law. In its early days, the school "saw itself as the working man's alternative to the elite schools" and "boasted of being 'An Evening Law School with Day School Standards,'" using the case method of teaching, according to legal historian Robert Stevens.

The school was renamed Northeastern University School of Law in 1922 and began admitting women that year. NUSL was accredited by the University of the State of New York in 1943 and became a member of the Association of American Law Schools in 1945. It was accredited by the American Bar Association in 1969.

In April 1953, Northeastern President Carl Ell announced that the law school would close. He cited the number of other law schools that had sprung up elsewhere in the city. Meanwhile, enrollment at Northeastern law school had plummeted, from 1,328 students in 1937-38 to 196 students in that year. The school's building and library on Mt. Vernon Street in Beacon Hill was eventually sold. Alumni - who composed one-fourth of Massachusetts's Superior Court judges as well as many District Court judges - worked to reestablish the law school in 1966, based upon the university's signature cooperative, or co-op, education model. Thomas J. O'Toole, a Harvard Law graduate, was selected as the school's dean in 1967. In 1970, Gryzmish Hall on Huntington Avenue was dedicated, which would later become part the Asa S. Knowles Center for Law. Despite the school's working-class origins, rigorous new admissions policies resulted in a small student body of 125 students who nearly all came from financially well-off families and upper-echelon undergraduate colleges. Still, half of those admitted as first-year students were women.

Over the ensuing decades, students worked in co-ops as varied as Native American land claims in rural Maine; assisting migrant farm laborers in east Texas; at the Moscow, Russia office of Baker & McKenzie; the United Nations High Commission for Refugees in New Delhi; and countless legal services offices.  In 1968, O'Toole, explaining the school's dedication to public interest law, told a Boston Globe reporter that "law schools are still teaching lawyers as if they were all going out to be corporation lawyers on Wall Street...(but) the big demand for lawyers today is in the field of public affairs in government, and in dealing with basic human problems, and no law school today seems to be training lawyers for those jobs."

Campus

The NUSL complex is located on Boston's Huntington Avenue and includes three adjacent buildings: Knowles Center, which houses offices and the Law Library; Cargill Hall, home to most faculty and some administrative offices as well as small seminar rooms and lecture halls; and Dockser Hall, which includes a moot courtroom, classrooms, seminar rooms, offices and lounge areas and space for the law school's clinical program.

Academics
NUSL offers a Juris Doctor (JD) program for full-time, on-campus students as well as a FlexJD program for part-time students online and on-campus that began in the fall of 2021. The law school also offers on-campus and online Master of Laws (LLM) programs for lawyers seeking to expand their legal knowledge. In addition, the school offers programs for non-lawyers, including a Master of Science (MS) in Media Advocacy and online programs leading to graduate certificates in health law, intellectual property law, business law and human resources law, plus a data privacy fundamentals program.

NUSL integrates full-time employment into its traditional JD curriculum, allowing students to graduate in three years - the same amount of time as peers at other law schools. Following the first year of study, students alternate between classroom and co-op professional experience until they graduate with three, full-time employment experiences. Instead of grades, students receive written evaluations from their professors and co-op employers.

Northeastern has been named as one of the top public interest law schools in the nation. Many students participate in the school's clinics and institutes, such as the Civil Rights and Restorative Justice Project.  In addition, all students are required to complete a year-long social justice project during their first year.

Northeastern is #1 for "Practical Training," according to The National Jurist.

The Princeton Review's "The Best 172 Law Schools" ranks Northeastern #2 among all the law schools for both providing the "best environment" for minority students and for having the "most liberal" students.

Costs
Tuition for a full-time Northeastern student is $56,940 per year. The total cost of attendance (indicating the cost of tuition, fees and living expenses) at Northeastern law school for the 2021–2022 academic year is $82,736.

Student organizations and journals
Northeastern University School of Law has many student-run organizations and activities, including affinity groups and shared interest groups such as Entertainment and Sports Law Society (ESLS), Human Rights Caucus (HRC) and Phi Alpha Delta International, a co-ed fraternity. NUSL is home to two scholarly legal journals.

Northeastern University Law Review
The Northeastern University Law Review is a law review founded in 2008 that publishes a broad array of legal scholarship primarily from law professors, judges, attorneys and law students. Staffed and edited by law students, it is published twice a year. Staff members are selected largely based on their writing abilities, tests and first-year grades. The law review also publishes content through its online publications: Extra Legal and the Online Forum.

Journal of Legal Education
NUSL is co-editor of the Journal of Legal Education, a quarterly publication of the Association of American Law Schools. The Journal publishes articles on legal theory, legal scholarship and legal education, among other topics. It claims a readership of more than 10,000 law instructors.

Research centers, institutes and clinical programs
 Center for Health Policy and Law
 Center for Law, Information and Creativity (CLIC)
 Center for Public Interest Advocacy and Collaboration (CPIAC)
 Civil Rights and Restorative Justice Project
 Community Business Clinic
 Criminal Justice Task Force
 Domestic Violence Institute
 Health in Justice Action Lab
 Immigrant Justice Clinic
 Initiative for Energy Justice
 IP CO-LAB
 NuLawLab
 Poverty Law and Practice Clinic
 Prisoners' Rights Clinic
 Program on Human Rights and the Global Economy
 Program on the Corporation, Law and Global Society
 Public Health Advocacy Institute
 Public Health Legal Clinic

Notable alumni
Charlotte Hunter Arley, lawyer in Reno, Nevada Petticoats Trial
Janet Bond Arterton, Judge, United States District Court for the District of Connecticut
Mary Bonauto, Civil Rights Project Director, Gay & Lesbian Advocates & Defenders; lead counsel in Goodridge v. Department of Public Health; MacArthur "Genius"
Margot Botsford, Justice, Massachusetts Supreme Judicial Court (retired)
Timothy Mark Burgess, Judge, United States District Court for the District of Alaska
Marie-Therese Connolly, Elder Rights Lawyer, MacArthur "Genius" 
William "Mo" Cowan, US Senator (retired); Vice President, Litigation and Legal Policy, General Electric
Harold Donohue, (deceased) Member, US House of Representatives
Martín Espada, poet, recipient of 2018 Ruth Lilly Poetry Prize
Dana Fabe, Justice, Alaska Supreme Court (retired)
Thomas A. Flaherty, (deceased) Member, US House of Representatives
Peter Franchot, Comptroller of Maryland
Kumiki Gibson, Former Chief Counsel to Vice President Al Gore 
Maggie Hassan, United States Senator for New Hampshire
Maura Healey, Governor and Attorney General (2015-2023), Commonwealth of Massachusetts
Courtney Hunt, Best Picture Academy Award-nominated film director/screenwriter in 2009 for Frozen River
 Candace S. Kovacic-Fleischer, gender equality expert, Professor emerita, Washington College of Law, American University
Landya McCafferty, US District Court Judge for the District of New Hampshire
Rishi Reddi, short story writer, Best American Short Stories
Emily Gray Rice, Former US Attorney for New Hampshire
Rashida Richardson, director of policy research at the AI Now Institute
Delissa A. Ridgway, Judge, US Court of International Trade
Victoria A. Roberts, Judge, United States District Court for the Eastern District of Michigan
Rachael Rollins, United States Attorney for the District of Massachusetts and District Attorney, Suffolk County (2019-2022)
Chase Strangio, ACLU Staff Attorney, LGBT & HIV Project, and transgender rights activist
Urvashi Vaid, Author, Irresistible Revolution: Confronting Race, Class and the Assumptions of LGBT Politics (2012) and Virtual Equality: The Mainstreaming of Lesbian and Gay Liberation (1996); CEO, The Vaid Group
Stephen Morse Wheeler, justice of the New Hampshire Supreme Court
Leslie Winner, North Carolina Former State Senator 
Leocadia Zak, President, Agnes Scott College

References

External links
Northeastern University School of Law

Northeastern University
Law schools in Massachusetts
Educational institutions established in 1898
1898 establishments in Massachusetts